The El Dorado Apartments in El Dorado, Arkansas are a historic apartment house at 420 Wilson Place.  The two story brick and limestone building was designed by Louisiana architect Cheshire Peyton, and built in 1926 in response to the discovery of oil in the area and the ensuing economic boom.  It houses 24 small efficiency units, designed for use by the transient but wealthier workers and managers of the oil-related economy.  The building has limestone window sills, and rows of brick-inlaid limestone squares between the windows.  The cornice of the flat roof is decorated with brick dentil moulding and modillions.

The building was listed on the National Register of Historic Places in 1983, and included in the Murphy-Hill Historic District in 2007.

See also
National Register of Historic Places listings in Union County, Arkansas

References

Residential buildings completed in 1926
Buildings and structures in El Dorado, Arkansas
National Register of Historic Places in Union County, Arkansas
Individually listed contributing properties to historic districts on the National Register in Arkansas
Apartment buildings on the National Register of Historic Places in Arkansas
1926 establishments in Arkansas